Beyond Shadowgate is a TurboGrafx CD sequel to the 1987 Mac and MacVenture game Shadowgate. Unlike its predecessor, Beyond Shadowgate is a classical point-and-click adventure viewed from a platform perspective. 

A 14 by 19 inch poster by veteran role-playing game artist Jim Holloway, who also created the game's opening and closing animation sequences, was folded inside the jewel case for the game.

Plot
The player controls Prince Erik, the descendant of the hero from the first game, Lord Jair. When Prince Erik returns to his home country, he finds out about his father's murder. The Prince is framed by the minister of the late king, who imprisons him where the adventure starts.

Gameplay
As in Shadowgate, the player must solve a series of puzzles throughout the castle in order to proceed to the end of the game. Prince Erik can move around, examine, manipulate, and take objects. Commands also allow ducking and punching. Traps and puzzles may cause the death of the character if they are not correctly solved.

Reception
Electronic Gaming Monthly gave the game a 7.5 out of 10. They criticized the slow pacing but praised the eerie mood, the graphics, the intellectually stimulating puzzles, and the ability to interact with nearly every item in the game. GamePro called Beyond Shadowgate "an enticing action/adventure RPG that combines the intricate puzzles of the original Shadowgate with a new graphic 3D environment." They also expressed approval for the realistic level of sound effects and the multiple routes through the game.

See also
 ICOM Simulations
 Shadowgate
 Shadowgate 64: Trials of the Four Towers, a sequel that takes place centuries after the first adventure.
 Zojoi

References

External links
Original artwork & software review of Beyond Shadowgate in DuoWorld Magazine (1993)
MobyGames entry on Beyond Shadowgate
Infinite Ventures' Shadowgate site
GameFAQs entry of Beyond Shadowgate

1993 video games
Adventure games
ICOM Simulations games
North America-exclusive video games
Shadowgate
TurboGrafx-CD games
TurboGrafx-CD-only games
Video game sequels
Video games developed in the United States
Video games set in castles
Single-player video games
Fantasy video games
Video games with alternate endings